Luigi Colausig (4 March 1914 – 27 July 1991), known as Gino Colaussi, was an Italian footballer who played as a striker.  He was the first player to score multiple goals in a World Cup final.

Club career
Colaussi was born in Gradisca d'Isonzo, Friuli-Venezia Giulia. He was a striker in Serie A for USC Triestina, Juventus and Vicenza, and also played in Serie B with Padova.

International career
Colaussi represented the Italy national football team at the gold winning 1933–35 Central European International Cup & at the 1938 FIFA World Cup. He scored a goal in Italy's quarterfinal and semifinal victories, and two in the victorious final, contributing to his nation's second World Cup title with a total of four goals.

Death
Colaussi died in Opicina, near Trieste.

Honours

Club
Juventus
Coppa Italia: 1941–42

International
Italy
FIFA World Cup: 1938
 Central European International Cup: 1933–35

References

1914 births
1991 deaths
People from Gradisca d'Isonzo
1938 FIFA World Cup players
FIFA World Cup-winning players
Association football forwards
Italian footballers
Italy international footballers
Calcio Padova players
Juventus F.C. players
Ternana Calcio players
Ternana Calcio managers
Serie A players
U.S. Triestina Calcio 1918 managers
Italian football managers
Footballers from Friuli Venezia Giulia